{{safesubst:#invoke:RfD||2=Atari VCS (2018 console)|month = February
|day = 23
|year = 2023
|time = 11:20
|timestamp = 20230223112011

|content=
REDIRECT Atari VCS (2021 console)

}}